Pierre de Witasse (6 August 1878 – 26 November 1956) was a Minister of State for Monaco. He was in office from 1944 to 1948.

References

Ministers of State of Monaco
1878 births
1956 deaths